Guy Segbaya (born 6 February 1951) is a Togolese boxer. He competed in the men's featherweight event at the 1972 Summer Olympics. He lost in his opening fight to Salah Mohamed Amin of Egypt.

References

External links
 

1951 births
Living people
Togolese male boxers
Olympic boxers of Togo
Boxers at the 1972 Summer Olympics
Place of birth missing (living people)
Featherweight boxers
21st-century Togolese people